José Guridi is an Argentine humorist.

Awards

Nominations
 2013 Martín Fierro Awards
 Best work in humor

References

Argentine comedians
Living people
Year of birth missing (living people)
Place of birth missing (living people)
21st-century Argentine people